The Battle of Lutterberg may refer to:

 Battle of Lutterberg (1758)
 Battle of Lutterberg (1762)